Elektorornis is an extinct genus of enantiornithean bird known from a partial hindlimb and a small amount of wing plumage. It contains a single species, Elektorornis chenguangi. The hindlimb and feathers were preserved in a piece of 99 million year old Burmese Amber found in Myanmar. In life, the bird would have been slightly smaller than a sparrow and possibly used its characteristically elongated middle toe to probe for food. Elektorornis chenguangi is the first species of bird described from remains found in Burmese amber, although other undiagnostic enantiornithean specimens have previously been found in amber.  is Greek for 'amber bird'.

References

External links

Late Cretaceous birds of Asia
Enantiornitheans
Fossil taxa described in 2019